Bill Bourke (7 February 1927 – 4 June 2002) was an  Australian rules footballer who played with the North Melbourne Football Club in the Victorian Football League (VFL).

Notes

External links 

1927 births
2002 deaths
Australian rules footballers from Victoria (Australia)
North Melbourne Football Club players